ʿAbd al-Raḥmān ibn Muljam al-Murādī was a Kharijite primarily known for having assassinated Ali ibn Abi Talib, the fourth caliph of the Rashidun Caliphate and the first imam according to the Shia.

Assassination plot
There were numerous defections from Ali's camp in the aftermath of the Battle of Siffin. A majority of these defectors gathered under one banner and came to be known as the Kharijites. A number of them met in Mecca and discussed the 659 Battle of Nahrawan, which took place as a consequence of Siffin, wherein most of their men were eradicated while facing Ali's army. They concocted a plot to assassinate three prominent Muslim personalities: Amr ibn Bakr al-Tamimi was to kill 'Amr ibn al-'As, al-Hujjaj al-Tamimi was to kill Mu'awiya ibn Abu Sufyan and ibn Muljam was tasked to kill the caliph, Ali. The assassination attempts were to occur simultaneously as the three Muslims came to lead morning prayer in their respective cities of Fustat, Damascus and Kufa. The method was to come out of the prayer ranks and strike the targets with a sword dipped in poison. On 22 January of that year, Amr escaped an assassination attempt by the Kharijite Zadawayh or Amr ibn Bakr, who killed Amr's stand-in for the Friday prayers, Kharija ibn Hudhafa, mistaking the latter for Amr. When the Kharijite was apprehended and brought before him, Amr proclaimed "You wanted me, but God wanted Kharija!" and he personally executed him.

Assassination of Ali 

On January 26, 661, while praying in the Great Mosque of Kufa, Ali was attacked by Abd al-Rahman ibn Muljam. He was wounded by ibn Muljam's poison-coated sword while prostrating during the Fajr prayer. Medical treatment for Ali was undertaken by Atheer bin Amr As-Sakooni, a leading physician; however, Ali succumbed to his injuries on January 28, 661.

Three days later Ali's son, Hasan ibn Ali, personally performed the execution of Ibn Muljam.

References

Citations

Cited sources

Further reading 

 
 

661 deaths
Kharijites
Assassins of heads of state
Ali
People from the Rashidun Caliphate
Executed assassins
7th-century criminals
7th-century Arabs
7th-century executions
Assassins of the medieval Islamic world
People executed for murder